The Vereniging STOP awacs is a Dutch organisation that fights against the noise nuisance caused by AWACS surveillance aircraft.

Noise nuisance by AWACS planes 
For 26 years the Vereniging STOP awacs has been organising actions against the presence of the seventeen AWACS surveillance planes (a derivative of Boeing 707 civil aeroplanes) that are stationed at the NATO Air Base Geilenkirchen in Germany, very close to the Dutch border. According to the organisation, residents of Parkstad Limburg experience severe noise nuisance from low-flying AWACS aircraft.

Noise measurements carried out by the Netherlands Ministry of Housing, Spatial Planning and the Environment showed that most AWACS flights produce noise levels of 100 db(A) or higher. Had the aircraft in question been civil Boeing 707s, there would have been a clear breach of European standards.

European Court of Human Rights
On 22 January 2008, sympathisers of the Vereniging STOP awacs made a complaint against the Dutch state to the European Court of Human Rights alleging an infringement of several articles of the European Convention on Human Rights, in deciding to cut down the forest on the border. The rights of the inhabitants of Onderbanken were, according to the complaint, not fairly judged against the potential hazard of the growing trees to AWACS planes taking off and landing. The complaint could not be made by the Vereniging STOP awacs as only natural persons rather than legal persons can file a case with the ECHR.

External links

References

Environmental organisations based in the Netherlands
Regions of Limburg (Netherlands)